Costa neoRomantica was a cruise ship completed for Costa Cruises in 1993 by Fincantieri in Italy as Costa Romantica, and a sister ship to . She was refurbished in 2003, renamed Costa neoRomantica in 2011, and from 2017 assigned to the Asian market. The ship was sold in 2020 to Celestyal Cruises as Celestyal Experience. She never operated for Celestyal and was sold again and renamed Antares Experience in September 2021, then beached for demolition at Gadani, Pakistan in December 2021.

Design and description
The vessel was powered by four diesel engines with two propellers creating .

In November 2011, Costa Romantica underwent a refurbishing. Two new half decks were added as a part of the refurbishment, as well as 111 new cabins, 120 cabins and suites with a balcony and several new amenities including bars and lounges. This increased the gross tonnage of the ship from 53,000 to 56,769 tons.

The cruise ship had capacity for 1,578 passengers in 789 cabins. The ship had a crew of 662.

Construction and career
The vessel was constructed by Fincantieri at their yard in Marghera, Italy with the yard number 5899. The cruise ship's keel was laid down on 23 April 1992 and the vessel was launched on 28 November 1992. Costa Romantica was completed on 25 September 1993 and entered service in November of that year. The vessel was registered in Genoa, Italy and was owned and operated by Costa Crociere.

After the incident, the vessel was stalled for more than 24 hours and for a long period there was no electricity or running water. The passengers were sent home and Costa Romanticas next scheduled cruise was cancelled.

Costa Romantica underwent a 90 million refurbishing at San Giorgio del Porto shipyard in Genoa in November 2011. After the contract was awarded to San Giorgio del Porto, the shipyard workers at Fincantieri began a week of strike action. After the refurbishing, the ship was renamed Costa neoRomantica and started her first voyage with the new name in March 2012. In early 2017, Costa neoRomantica arrived in Hong Kong to operate cruises in the Asia market. In February 2018, Costa neoRomantica served as The J Winter Fashion Show 2018 setting in Hong Kong.

During the COVID-19 pandemic, cruises from China aboard Costa neoRomantica were cancelled at the end of January and early February 2020. This was later extended  through the end of February. While awaiting permission to sail, the vessel remained in Vietnam. On 26 March the ship with no passengers on board, anchored at the roadstead of Vladivostok, Russia to refresh the ship with water, fuel, and food. However, it was denied entrance as the Russian sanitary officials stipulated the dock workers to be quarantined for 14 days. No COVID-19 cases on board were reported.

In July 2020, the ship was sold to Celestyal Cruises, renamed Celestyal Experience and laid up at Piraeus, later at Eleusis. In September 2021, due to the pandemic, Celestyal sold the ship, while still in lay-up, to Beacon & Bay Shipping Services of Dubai, who renamed her Antares Experience, reportedly for on-sale for future trading. It was later reported that she was sold for scrap. In November 2021, the ship sailed to the Gadani Ship Breaking Yard in Pakistan for scrapping and was beached on 3 December.

Citations

References

External links 
 

1992 ships
Cruise ships
Ships built in Venice
Ships built by Fincantieri
Maritime incidents in 2009